Richard White Longmuir Tibbits (1846–1924) was an insurance agent and political figure in New Brunswick, Canada. He represented Victoria County in the Legislative Assembly of New Brunswick from 1883 to 1884 as a Conservative member.

He was born in Quebec, the son of James Tibbits, who also served in the New Brunswick assembly. He was educated at Lennoxville College. In 1874, he married Sarah A. Clark. Tibbits was also a justice of the peace and secretary-treasurer for the county. He lived in Andover.

References 

The Canadian parliamentary companion, 1883 JA Gemmill

1846 births
1924 deaths
Progressive Conservative Party of New Brunswick MLAs
People from Perth-Andover
Canadian justices of the peace